Mian Muhammad Mansha is a Pakistani business magnate and billionaire. He is the founder and CEO of the Lahore-based international conglomerate Nishat Group. Mansha and some of his immediate family members are among the richest and highest tax-paying individuals in Pakistan.

Mansha owns some of the most expensive houses in Europe, including at the St. Georges Hill gated estate in London.

Early life and career
In the 1930s, Mansha's family had migrated to Kolkata, Bengal from Punjab. After the 1947 Partition of British India, the family returned to Punjab, Pakistan. Mian Muhammad Mansha's father started a cotton ginning business which later became the Nishat Textile Mills.

Mansha was born in Faisalabad to a wealthy family. He did his early schooling at Sacred Heart Convent, Faisalabad, and later joined Hendon College, London for higher studies in business administration.

Career
He started his career as one of the most prominent industrialists of Pakistan. Nishat Textiles Mills was started in 1951 by his father and uncles. His father died one year after he returned from London after finishing his studies there in 1968. Mian Muhammad Mansha joined the family business in 1969 and eventually he split with his uncles and took over the family business. He was worth US$2.5 billion in 2013. Apart from making large acquisitions, he was simultaneously expanding his Nishat Textiles segment. Nishat Textiles Mills is Pakistan's largest fabric manufacturing mills.

After 1979, Mansha set up Pakistan's largest textile complex of seven factories in Nishatabad in the city of Faisalabad. In later years, another textile complex followed in Chunian near Lahore.

Mansha's conglomerate benefited greatly from the privatisation drive by the governments of the 1990s. During this period, he made a number of acquisitions and buy-outs, including engineering at least one hostile takeover. When the dust settled, Mansha had acquired a controlling position in Adamjee Insurance, the country's largest non-life insurer. Nishat Mills also acquired two thermal power plants near its D. G. Khan Cement Factory located in Dera Ghazi Khan District, Punjab, previously owned by the Saigol family. Business analysts in Pakistan reportedly said that the acquisition of two thermal power plants would ensure uninterrupted power supply to D. G. Khan Cement Factory for the Nishat Group. While going through these large acquisitions, he was simultaneously expanding his Nishat Textiles segment, Nishat Textile Mills is Pakistan's largest fabric manufacturing company.

But all these achievements, perhaps, play third fiddle to Mansha's master-stroke: the acquisition of one of Pakistan's most profitable banks, MCB Bank Limited or better known as Muslim Commercial Bank. Competing with several other bidders in a privatisation process, there were several challenges to overcome, but ultimately he persevered. Under Mansha's watch, MCB Bank has demonstrated execution and growth and which has made it one of the premier financial service management teams in the Indian subcontinent. Today, MCB Bank is one of the top 4 banks in the country and leads in terms of market capitalisation with a massive employee base of roughly 18,000.

Mansha has proceeded to venture into new terrain, executing deals with state-owned WAPDA (Water and Power Development Authority) to sell its excess electric power capacity generated at Nishat's various power stations. This led to the founding of Nishat Power, which is now a growing business with Mansha's son playing a senior role in the company's executive board.

MCB Bank, in 2008, started a partnership with Maybank of Malaysia. Maybank now has a 20% share in MCB Bank. In 2009, Mian Muhammad Mansha, chairman of MCB Bank, said that his efforts were successful in continuing to bring foreign investment to Pakistan and that his bank had already brought 970 million U.S. dollars' investment into the country from Malaysia following a deal with May Bank, Malaysia.
He was selected for a special Lunch with the UK Financial Times newspaper. According to Forbes listings in 2010, he was the 937th richest person in the world and the richest person in Pakistan.

With $700 million in cash from MCB Bank and another $300 million raised from international markets, Mansha has aspirations of acquiring an established bank in Indonesia and possibly even in the Middle East. MCB Bank already has international operations, and the Nishat Group also owns an automobile leasing company in Kazakhstan. Further plans include major infrastructure projects in Pakistan, such as the construction of electric power plants based on coal-powered generation of electricity and sea ports.

Achievements and awards

Mansha is currently on the board of various prominent institutes in Pakistan and is one of the most powerful and influential people in the country. He was awarded the Sitara-e-Imtiaz civil award by President of Pakistan Pervez Musharraf on 23 March 2004. One of Mansha's companies, Nishat Textile Mills Limited, is the largest exporting entity in Pakistan.

Mansha is also a member of the board of directors at the Atlantic Council.

Personal wealth
Mansha was named richest Pakistani in 2008 by Daily Pakistan with net worth of US$2.5 billion equivalent to Rs 200 billion at that time. In March 2010, Mansha was the first Pakistani making it to the Forbes billionaires list.

Mansha owns red Mercedes E-class, Jaguar convertible, a Porsche turbo, a BMW 750, a Range Rover, and a Volkswagen, besides a turboprop plane and an eight-seater jet. 

Mansha was previously a British Airways First Class customer before it was reduced to a three class service from 2008.

Criticism

In 2004, Mansha's group and his preferred candidate were defeated by a margin of two votes in the All Pakistan Textile Mills Association (APTMA) elections. Mansha subsequently resigned from APTMA.

D.G. Khan Cement Company, which is part of Mansha's Nishat Group, was once the target of violence by local people living near the factory. The issue is still in Court and not resolved but started production after increasing security around the plant.

Mian Muhammad Mansha has never met U.S. businessman Warren Buffett but is one of his admirers. He sometimes seeks advice from the U.S. 'vulture investor' Carl Icahn who once advised him to stay away from investing in airlines, and therefore, Mansha says he has no interest in buying out Pakistan International Airlines, if it is privatised by the government in the future. Carl Icahn's advice was coloured by his bad experience with the now defunct Trans World Airlines. Carl Icahn reportedly told him, "In good times, the unions take away the profits, and in bad times, the cost of oil kills you." Mansha sometimes goes over to India and has business meetings there with other fellow billionaires like Sunil Mittal. In recent pandemic COVID-19 Mian Mansha and the Nishat Group fired their 800-900 employees in a day and he faced a huge criticism on social media.

See also 
 Muslim Commercial Bank
 List of Pakistanis by net worth

References 

1947 births
Living people
Pakistani billionaires
Alumni of Middlesex University
Pakistani chief executives
Pakistani industrialists
People from Chiniot District
Chinioti people
Recipients of Sitara-i-Imtiaz
Businesspeople from Lahore
People named in the Paradise Papers
People from Lahore